The Wolverine is a higher-speed passenger train service operated by Amtrak as part of its Michigan Services. The  line provides three daily round-trips between Chicago and Pontiac, Michigan, via Ann Arbor and Detroit. It carries a heritage train name descended from the New York Central (Michigan Central).

During fiscal year 2022, the Wolverine carried 367,254 passengers, a 138.6% increase from FY 2021's total of 153,923 passengers.

History

Before Amtrak's takeover of most private-sector passenger service in 1971 the Wolverine was one of three trains which operated over the Michigan Central route between Chicago and Detroit. Under Penn Central operation it continued through South-Western Ontario (Canada) to Buffalo, New York. Amtrak retained two trains (the other was the renamed St. Clair) and truncated the operation to Detroit but otherwise changed little. In April 1975, Amtrak introduced French-built Turboliner equipment to the Michigan route and added a third round-trip. A pool of three Turboliner trainsets served the route, and the three round-trip pairs were numbered 350—355, train numbers which are still in use today. Amtrak dropped the individual train names and rebranded all three Turboliner, in common with similar services to St. Louis, Missouri and Milwaukee, Wisconsin. The new equipment led to massive gains in ridership, topping 340,000 in 1975 and 370,000 in 1976.

The Turboliners became a victim of their own success. Although fast (and flashy), they were unable to reach their design speed of  because of the poor quality of the Penn Central track in Michigan. The five-car fixed consists had a maximum capacity of 292 passengers, which was often not enough. Starting in March 1976 Amtrak began replacing some of the Turboliners with conventional equipment, including new Amfleet coaches. Individual names returned to the corridor, with the heretofore unnamed third train becoming the Twilight Limited. The last Turboliners left the corridor in 1981.

Amtrak extended the Wolverine and Twilight Limited to Pontiac on May 5, 1994. With this change service began at a new station in Detroit's New Center. Although the Michigan Central Station in Corktown, Detroit, had closed on January 6, 1988, trains continued to stop at a temporary platform just east of the old station. Besides Pontiac, new stations were opened at Royal Oak and Troy. The Lake Cities also began serving Pontiac after the end of Toledo service in 1995.

Amtrak dropped individual names again in 2004 and named all three trains Wolverine.

Due to the increased ridership on these trains, Amtrak tested an additional Chicago-Kalamazoo Wolverine frequency September 2 to September 7, 2010. This was done to determine all that would be involved in operations should Amtrak decide to initiate such service in the future.

Michigan City station closed on April 4, 2022. At that time, it was served by just  round trips.

Higher-speed operation 

In 2016, work to allow higher-speed operation on 41 miles of track between Battle Creek and Jackson, including "...replacing 26,000 railroad ties, repairing or installing 15 track switches, realigning or modifying 29 railroad curves, repairing 23 railroad grade crossings and improving road profiles at crossings", was completed.

Amtrak owns the  stretch of the Wolverine's route from Porter, Indiana to Kalamazoo, Michigan and it is the longest segment of track owned by Amtrak outside of the Northeast Corridor. Starting in January 2002 Amtrak began track improvements to increase the allowed speed along this section of track. Amtrak trains currently travel at top speeds of  along this section of track.

This will make it easier to maintain track and eventually upgrade it to  running by late 2017. As part of the purchase agreement, MDOT also agreed to double-track the line east of Ypsilanti.

On May 25, 2021, the speed on section between Kalamazoo and Albion was increased to 110 MPH. In the future, the section between Albion and Dearborn will get the same speed upgrade. As of May 2021, there are currently no plans to upgrade the rest of the line.

Proposed expansion

In March 2016, Ypsilanti approved $2 million toward the construction of a train platform in the Depot Town area of the city along the Wolverine route. MDOT estimated that the stop would attract 9,000 annual riders. In June 2020 the city rescinded the $2 million after failing to receive a federal grant to move the project forward. The last train to serve Ypsilanti was the Twilight Limited in 1985.

In August 2019, Amtrak proposed extending at least one round trip from Detroit to Toronto via the Windsor–Quebec City Corridor. The service would require track upgrades and the construction of a border processing facility. An intermediate Amtrak Thruway bus connection to Toronto was also raised.

Route details

The Wolverine operates over Norfolk Southern Railway, Amtrak, Conrail, and Canadian National Railway trackage:
NS Chicago Line, Chicago to Porter
Amtrak Chicago–Detroit Line, Porter to Kalamazoo
MDOT (d/b/a Amtrak) Michigan Line, Kalamazoo to Dearborn (CN South Bend Sub from CP Gord to CP Baron in Battle Creek, MI)
CR Michigan Line, Dearborn (CP Townline) to Detroit (CP Conrail)
CN Shore Line Subdivision and Holly Subdivision, Detroit (Federal Junction) to Pontiac

Station stops

Equipment

, each Wolverine operates with two General Electric Genesis P42DC locomotives, 3-5 Horizon coaches, and an Amfleet cafe/business class car. In the winter, Superliners are sometimes used. The equipment pool for the Wolverines comprises 14 Horizon coaches and 3.5 Amfleet cafe/business class cars (one is shared with the Blue Water), split across three consists. The locomotives usually operate in a push-pull configuration, however sometimes both will be at the head end.  Due to the FRA requirement of positive train control for operations above 79 mph, locomotives on the Wolverine are required to have Positive Train Control, supplied by Amtrak's Incremental Train Control System. Because of this modification the units equipped with PTC are usually captive to the Michigan services.

Between 2016-2018 Michigan expected to take delivery of new bilevel cars which will displace the Horizons and Amfleets in regular service. In addition, in early 2014 the Michigan Department of Transportation issued a request for proposal aimed at acquiring additional passenger equipment for use between 2014-2017.

In September 2014, the state of Michigan reached an agreement with Talgo, a Spanish railcar manufacturer, to buy two trainsets for the Wolverine, at a cost of $58 million. The trains had been previously built for the state of Wisconsin, before plans for expanded passenger rail service in that state were canceled and the trainsets placed in storage. The new equipment would have provided a substantial upgrade in passenger amenities over the Amtrak-owned railcars used on the route. Despite this proposal, the Talgo railcars remained at the Amtrak facility in Beech Grove until 2019 when they were moved back to Milwaukee. In 2019, the trains were being considered for use for the Amtrak Cascades route in the Pacific Northwest instead of in Michigan, but the trains were ultimately sold to Nigeria for use on the Lagos Rail Mass Transit.

The bilevel car order never materialized due to the failure of a critical crash test by the manufacturer. In the end, the order was switched to new single-level Siemens Venture cars that are similar to the Brightline fleet. By January 2021, some Venture cars had been delivered to Amtrak for testing and were being deployed on the Wolverine route for test runs.

Michigan was also involved in a joint purchase with other states to purchase the new Siemens Charger locomotives.

See also
Ohio Hub

References

Notes

External links

Amtrak routes
Central Michigan
West Michigan
Passenger rail transportation in Illinois
Passenger rail transportation in Indiana
Passenger rail transportation in Michigan
Higher-speed rail
Railway services introduced in 1971